Basantapur may refer to several places in Nepal:

Basantapur, Kathmandu
Basantapur, Gandaki
Basantapur, Janakpur
Basantapur, Kapilvastu
Basantapur, Kosi
Basantapur, Sunsari
Basantapur, Rupandehi
Basantapur, Mahakali